The Saturn Award for Best New Media Television Series was one of the annual awards given by the American Academy of Science Fiction, Fantasy & Horror Films. The Saturn Awards, which are the oldest film and series-specialized awards to reward science fiction, fantasy, and horror achievements, included the category for the first time at the 42nd Saturn Awards ceremony, when the Saturn Award went through major changes in their television categories. It specifically rewards streaming television series created for non-traditional platforms such as Netflix, Amazon, and Hulu. At the 45th Saturn Awards, it was discontinued to make room for the Saturn Awards for best streaming horror/thriller and science fiction/action/fantasy series, in addition to the award for best streaming superhero series.

(NOTE: Year refers to year of eligibility, the actual ceremonies are held the following year)

The winners are listed in bold.

Winners and nominees

2010s

Most nominations
 2 nominations – Bosch, Daredevil, The Man in the High Castle, Stranger Things

See also
 Saturn Award for Best Streaming Horror & Thriller Series
 Saturn Award for Best Streaming Science Fiction, Action & Fantasy Series
 Saturn Award for Best Streaming Superhero Series

References

External links
 Official site

Saturn Awards